North Carolina Highway 217 (NC 217) is a primary state highway in the U.S. state of North Carolina. The highway connects the town of Linden to nearby Erwin to Fayetteville.

Route description
NC 217 is a two-lane rural highway that serves as a back-door road between Erwin and Fayetteville, connecting the town of Linden. In Erwin, it has a concurrency with NC 82. Also in Erwin, the highway is concurrent with North Carolina Bicycle Route 5 from the southern NC 82 intersection to J Street.

History
Established in 1933 as a new primary routing, it traveled from NC 21 (now U.S. Route 401 or US 401) to NC 55 (now NC 82). In 1936, it was extended north (concurrency with NC 82) to US 421/NC 60 (now Denim Drive).  In 1957 it was extended north again to its current northern terminus at US 421/NC 55.

Junction list

References

External links

 
 NCRoads.com: N.C. 217

217
Transportation in Cumberland County, North Carolina
Transportation in Harnett County, North Carolina